Dobris may refer to
Dobříš, a town in the Czech Republic
Döbris, a village and a former municipality in Germany
Joel Dobris (born c. 1940), American lawyer